The 1868 Missouri gubernatorial election was held on November 3, 1868 and resulted in a victory for the Republican nominee, Congressman Joseph W. McClurg, over Democratic nominee former Congressman John S. Phelps.

This was the first election a governor was elected to a 2-year term, instead of 4 years. Missouri would return to electing its governors to 4-year terms in 1880.

Results

References

Missouri
1868
Gubernatorial
November 1868 events